Aleksey Ivanovich Kuznetsov (15 August 1929 – 28 March 2003) was a former Soviet cross-country skier who competed during the 1950s and 1960s, training in Gorodets at VSS Urozhai. He earned a bronze medal in the 4 x 10 km relay at the 1960 Winter Olympics in Squaw Valley. He won two medals in the 4 x 10 km relay at the Nordic skiing World Championships with a silver in 1954 and a bronze 1962.

Notes

External links
Sports Illustrated medal profile (As Aleksei Kuznetsov)
World Championship results 

1929 births
2003 deaths
Olympic cross-country skiers of the Soviet Union
Olympic bronze medalists for the Soviet Union
Soviet male cross-country skiers
Cross-country skiers at the 1960 Winter Olympics
Olympic medalists in cross-country skiing
FIS Nordic World Ski Championships medalists in cross-country skiing
Medalists at the 1960 Winter Olympics